"1999" is a song by American musician Prince, the title track from his 1982 album of the same name. Originally peaking at number 44 on the Billboard Hot 100, a December 1982 rerelease later peaked at number 12 in the US, while a January 1985 rerelease, a double A-side with "Little Red Corvette", later peaked at number 2 in the UK.

Rolling Stone ranked "1999" number 339 on their list of the 500 Greatest Songs of All Time. Following Prince's death, the song re-charted on the Billboard Hot 100 at number 41, later moving up to number 27, making it the fourth separate time the song had entered the Hot 100 and the third different decade in which the song re-charted (as after its two 1980s entries, it made the chart again on January 16, 1999 at number 40). As of April 30, 2016, it has sold 727,363 copies in the United States.

Recording
The album version of the song starts with a slowed-down voice stating "Don't worry, I won't hurt you. I only want you to have some fun." Prince shares lead vocals on the track with members of his band the Revolution, namely Dez Dickerson, Lisa Coleman and Jill Jones. Originally conceived to be a three-part harmony, it was later decided to separate out the voices that started each verse. Distinct scratching and explosion noises heard in the track were to cover mistakes during recording of a good take.

Reception
Billboard said that "the Apocalypse never sounded this danceable before."

Some music critics have suggested Phil Collins' 1985 song "Sussudio" sounds very similar to "1999". Collins confirmed this claim, and remembers listening to "1999" frequently while he was on tour with Genesis.

Re-release
In January 1985, "1999" was released as a 12" single in the US with "Little Red Corvette" as the B-side, and "How Come U Don't Call Me Anymore?"/"D.M.S.R." in the UK. The single peaked at number 2 in its second week of release.

The song was re-recorded at the end of 1998 and was released the following year as 1999: The New Master.

"1999" was re-released in the UK and the US in late 1998 to accompany the song's namesake year. It was released on 12" vinyl with the same track listing as the original 12" single: the album version, along with "How Come U Don't Call Me Anymore?" and "D.M.S.R." A CD single was also issued with the same track listing, except the edit of "1999" was substituted for the album version. It was also re-released again towards the end of its namesake year. The original version re-charted within the Top 40 on the US Billboard Hot 100 in December 1998, becoming Prince's last top 40 hit before his death in 2016.

Music video
The video, directed by Bruce Gowers, was shot during the last week of rehearsals for the 1999 Tour. It depicts Prince and his band during a live performance. Just in time to take his part after Lisa Coleman, Jill Jones and Dez Dickerson, Prince appears on the stage from above, gliding down on a fireman's pole, wearing a glittery purple long coat.

Something went wrong with shooting Dez's lead vocal line and the footage was actually re-shot by a local camera crew the afternoon prior to the first show of the 1999 Tour in Chattanooga on November 11, 1982.

VH1 notably played this video continuously from midnight Eastern Time on December 31, 1998 to the next midnight on January 1, 1999.

Personnel 

 Prince - all vocals and instruments, except where noted
 Lisa Coleman - vocals
 Dez Dickerson - vocals
 Jill Jones - vocals
 Jesse Johnson - backing vocals (uncredited)

Track listing
 7"
 "1999"
 "How Come U Don't Call Me Anymore?"

 12" UK
 "1999"
 "D.M.S.R."

 12" West Germany
 "1999"
 "Let's Pretend We're Married"

 CD - 1998 re-release
 "1999"
 "Uptown"
 "Controversy"
 "Dirty Mind"
 "Sexuality"

 12" - 1985 re-release
 "1999"
 "How Come U Don't Call Me Anymore?"
 "D.M.S.R."

Charts

First release (1982)

US re-release (1983)

UK re-release (1985)

Worldwide re-release (1998/1999)

Year-end charts

Certifications and sales

See also
List of anti-war songs
List of number-one dance singles of 1982 (U.S.)

Notes

References

External links
 

1982 singles
1982 songs
1998 singles
Prince (musician) songs
Anti-war songs
Music videos directed by Bruce Gowers
Song recordings produced by Prince (musician)
Songs about dancing
Songs about nuclear war and weapons
Songs written by Prince (musician)
Warner Records singles